Jeb Bush is a Republican politician in the United States. Bush was governor of Florida from 1999 to 2007.  He was a candidate for the Republican nomination for president of the United States in the 2016 election.

Overall political stance
In 2013, statistician Nate Silver "constructed ideological scores for a set of plausible 2016 Republican candidates based on a combination of three statistical indices."  Bush's ideological score on this scale was similar to that of previous Republican nominees John McCain and Mitt Romney. A January 2015 Bloomberg News analysis suggested that Jeb Bush is more conservative than former presidents George W. Bush (Jeb's brother) and George H. W. Bush (Jeb's father). Ramesh Ponnuru of the conservative National Review, writes that "Despite his reputation for moderation, on issue after issue Jeb has taken positions that are significantly to the right of his brother's — and of every other president in recent memory."

Before winning two terms as governor, Bush lost his first run for governor of Florida in 1994 to the incumbent Democratic Governor, Lawton Chiles. In his 1994 race, Bush "called himself a 'head-banging conservative.'" Andrew Prokop of Vox writes that after his loss in the 1994 election, Bush retained very conservative beliefs and policies, but sought to adopt a more moderate image.

Bush was subsequently elected governor for two terms in office, from 1999 to 2007. Darryl Paulson, professor emeritus of government at the University of South Florida, said: "[Bush] governed as a conservative, and everyone in the Florida Republican Party considered him a conservative." Adam C. Smith, political editor of the Tampa Bay Times, writes that "Bush was not just a successful Republican governor politically; he was a conservative activist governor who relished pushing the envelope on policy." Steve Schmidt, senior campaign advisor to McCain in the 2008 presidential campaign, stated that at the time Bush left office as governor of Florida, "he was widely, unanimously, unambiguously regarded as the most conservative governor in the United States." Political scientist Susan MacManus of the University of South Florida, said: "In Florida, [Bush is] still perceived as conservative, especially on fiscal issues and even on social issues."

In a February 2015 question-and-answer session with Sean Hannity at the CPAC conference, Bush stated: "I would describe myself as a practicing, reform-minded conservative."

Bush has been criticized by some Tea Party members as being insufficiently conservative, as he supports positions on immigration and the Common Core State Standards Initiative that are unpopular with some conservatives.

Domestic issues

Abortion
Bush supports legislation to ban abortion after 20 weeks, making exceptions for the life of the mother, rape, or incest. In August 2015, Bush said: "My record as a pro-life governor is not in dispute. I am completely pro-life and I believe that we should have a culture of life." In 2003, Bush described himself as "probably the most pro-life governor in modern times."

As governor, Bush signed a parental notification act into law and supported the creation of a "Choose Life" specialty license plate. In 2003, Bush attracted national media attention after his administration sought the appointment of a guardian for the fetus of a developmentally disabled rape victim, a move which "angered women's rights groups and reignited the debate over abortion in Florida." In 2005, Bush sought to block a 13-year-old pregnant girl who had lived in a state-licensed group home from obtaining an abortion; a judge ruled against the state, and Bush decided not to appeal further.

Bush supports the defunding of Planned Parenthood. In July 2015, Bush called for a congressional investigation of Planned Parenthood in connection with an undercover video controversy. In August 2015, Bush said, "I, for one, don't think Planned Parenthood ought to get a penny ... And that's the difference because they're not actually doing women's health issues. They're involved in something way different than that." The Washington Post "Fact Checker" column said that this statement was a "false claim" and "patently incorrect," and Politifact rated it "Pants on Fire," with both noting that Planned Parenthood provides a wide array of women's health services.

In October 2015, Bush said on Fox News Sunday that he opposed shutting down the government in an attempt to defund Planned Parenthood, as some congressional Republicans have pushed for. Bush stated: "That's not how democracy works."

As governor of Florida, Bush used his line-item veto to eliminate funding for Planned Parenthood affiliates in Florida, which had previously used state funds to provide pap smears, sexually transmitted disease screening and treatment, and family planning services to poor women. Bush redirected those funds to abstinence-only sex education programs.

Affirmative action
In early 2015, Bush touted an executive order that he issued as governor of Florida which limited affirmative action.  In November 1999, as governor of Florida, Bush issued a "One Florida" executive order banning affirmative action in the State University System of Florida. Bush stated that he issued the order to head off a more-restrictive Ward Connerly-backed ballot initiative. The order was controversial, particularly among black Americans, and led to a widely publicized sit-in in Bush's Florida State Capitol office by two Democratic state legislators, Senator Kendrick Meek and Representative Tony Hill. Following the Bush executive order, black enrollment at state universities (and especially at the University of Florida and Florida State University) has declined.

Civil liberties and electronic surveillance
Bush supports the USA Patriot Act, and criticized efforts to stop its reauthorization.  Bush stated that opponents of the Act's reauthorization were "wrong" and that "the Patriot Act has kept us safe, plain and simple. The metadata program has kept us safe, plain and simple. There's been no violation of civil liberties."

Bush supports the continued collection of metadata of phone calls by the National Security Agency.  In a February 2015 speech, Bush said that the NSA metadata domestic-surveillance program was "hugely important" and said that he was perplexed at the opposition to the program: "For the life of me I don't understand, the debate has gotten off track." In August 2015, Bush said that he favored expanded government surveillance of Americans to "make sure that evildoers aren't in our midst." Bush said that encryption "makes it harder for the American government to do its job" and called for more cooperation between the government and U.S. technology companies.  Bush stated, "There's a place to find common ground between personal civil liberties and [the National Security Agency] doing its job.  I think the balance has actually gone the wrong way." In a December 2015 interview on Fox and Friends, Bush said of the bulk collection of phone call metadata, Bush said: "This is part of a comprehensive strategy to protect the homeland. Civil liberties are not being violated, and to have the NSA have this information is part of an essential tool for us to be kept safe."

In September 2015, Bush published a five-point cybersecurity plan that would establish a "command focus" on Internet security. The plan calls for increased funding, greater cooperation internationally and between the public and private sectors, and more government accountability to combat Internet security threats.  Bush also reiterated his support for the NSA and argued in favor of the Cybersecurity Information Sharing Act (CISA).  Privacy experts believe the proposed legislation includes loopholes which could be used to increase government surveillance.

When asked by Michael Medved in an April 2015 talk radio interview "what has been the best part of the Obama administration?" Bush responded: "I would say the best part of the Obama administration would be his continuance of the protections of the homeland using the big metadata programs, the NSA being enhanced."

In July 2015, Bush said that NSA whistleblower Edward Snowden "should be given no leniency." Bush's comment was in response to a statement made by former U.S. Attorney General Eric Holder, who suggested that some sort of deal was possible to allowing Snowden to return to the United States.

Bush condemned his primary rival Donald Trump's proposal to create a database to track American Muslims, close mosques, and possibly require American Muslims to carry special identification. Bush characterized such proposals as un-American, saying: "I find it abhorrent that Donald Trump is suggesting we register people ... You're talking about internment, you're talking about closing mosques, you're talking about registering people, and that's just wrong, I don't care about campaigns. It's not a question of toughness, it's manipulating people's angst and their fears."

Confederate flag
In early February 2001, while governor of Florida, Bush quietly ordered the removal of the Confederate "Stainless Banner" flag from the Florida State Capitol grounds.

In June 2015, Bush stated that he viewed the Confederate flag as a racist symbol. In December 2015, Bush said: "The problem with the Confederate flag isn't the Confederacy. The problem with the Confederate flag is what it began to represent later."

Crime and criminal justice
Bush is a supporter of the death penalty. In his unsuccessful 1994 campaign for Florida governor, Bush promised to sign many more death warrants as governor. One of the "central themes" of Bush's 1994 campaign was his proposal to shorten the appeals period in capital cases. Bush proposed limiting death-row inmates to a single appeal (a plan Bush called "one trial, one appeal") to speed up the execution process to "two to four years in most death cases." During Bush's term as governor, some 21 prisoners were executed.

Also in his 1994 campaign, Bush proposed publishing the names of juvenile delinquents so the public would "know who the thugs are in their neighborhoods."

In 2002, Bush opposed a Florida ballot measure that would have allowed nonviolent drug offenders to enter treatment programs instead of prison. Bush's then-24-year-old daughter had been arrested the same year on drug-related charges and underwent treatment.

In 2016, while campaigning for the presidency, Bush spoke publicly about his family's experience with addiction and published on Medium.com a "multi-pronged" addiction policy plan, "which includes working to begin drug abuse and addiction prevention during childhood, strengthening the criminal justice response to the epidemic by helping nonviolent offenders receive treatment and increasing punishments for sales, stopping the flow of illegal drugs across the border, and improving treatment and recovery programs."

Education

K-12
As Florida governor, Bush placed significant emphasis on education reform, particularly in the areas of "test-based accountability, private-school vouchers, and support for improved reading instruction." A major provision of Bush's voucher plan (the Opportunity Scholarship Program) was struck down in 2006 by the Florida Supreme Court and was replaced by a different plan, which is also being challenged in courts. Bush has frequently criticized traditional public schools and teachers' unions. He has described public schools as "politicized, unionized monopolies" and "government-run monopolies run by unions." He is a proponent of charter schools, and as governor he advocated high-stakes testing in Florida, arguing that this improves accountability.

As governor of Florida, Bush oversaw the establishment of a new plan in which schools were given a letter grade (from "A" to "F"). In 2013, Bush praised outgoing New York City mayor Michael Bloomberg for instituting a similar school-grading policy, and criticized incoming Mayor Bill de Blasio for his opposition to it.

In November 2014, Bush advocated for increased pay for educators, saying, "It's too bad we can't use the money we are wasting on meeting arbitrary numbers and divert it to where it will do more good, such as rewarding our best teachers with the pay they deserve. Great teachers are critical to the success of children, and incentivizing them to stay on the job, or to teach in our most-challenging schools, is a reform that actually will produce results."

In August 2015, Bush expressed support for "total voucherization" of schools, saying that schools would benefit from "innovation."

Bush supports the Common Core State Standards Initiative, but "opposes using federal funds to motivate or force states to adopt Common Core." He has challenged opponents of Common Core to come up with an alternative with even more rigorous standards, saying: "If people don't like Common Core, fine. Just make sure your standards are much higher than they were before."

Bush was a staunch opponent of a 2002 amendment to the Florida Constitution which limited class sizes. The amendment was approved by voters over Bush's strong objections. In 2015, Bush called for the class-size amendment to be repealed.

In his 1995 book, Bush suggested that corporal punishment in schools could prevent school shootings.

Higher education
Bush has supported a shift from "a provider-driven model to a consumer-driven one" in higher education and has suggested "exporting U.S. post-secondary education to global consumers at scale."

In 2015, Bush criticized Democratic presidential candidates' college affordability and debt-free college proposals, characterizing such proposals as "more free stuff" without reform.

Bush is a supporter of for-profit colleges and has "close ties to for-profit online education models." He has criticized the "gainful employment rule" adopted by the Department of Education under the Obama administration. This rule aims "to hold institutions accountable for consistently leaving students with big debts and little employment prospects." Bush believes that the rule's treatment of for-profit institutions is too harsh.

As governor of Florida, Bush proposed cutting $111 million from the budgets of Florida public universities and community colleges. Bush ultimately signed a budget that cut $11 million from community college budgets, which "forced them to turn away about 35,000 students looking to enroll." By 2004, however, "Bush was able to fully fund community colleges, earning plaudits from state educators."

Other
In a November 1994 interview with the Orlando Sentinel, Bush stated that he "would abolish the Department of Education as it now exists."

In 2003, as Florida governor, Bush sought to close the Florida State Library, and lay off its entire staff of 41 as a cost-cutting measure. Bush proposed moving the library's collection to a private university in South Florida. Bush's proposal generated substantial public opposition, and was dropped after the Florida Legislature refused to support it.

Environment
In early 2015, Bush called the Environmental Protection Agency "a pig in slop" and stated "We have to begin to rein in this top-down driven regulatory system."

As governor of Florida, Bush oversaw an Everglades restoration plan that was part of an $8 billion project conducted in conjunction with the federal government. The plan set aside over one million acres of land for conservation. Michael Grunwald writes that "at best, [Bush's] legacy in the Everglades is mixed. It's hard to argue for better considering how little of his vision has come to fruition, even if you accept his claim that his vision was foolishly abandoned by a successor who listened too carefully to shortsighted Everglades activists. ... Still, his critics and allies agree he's formidable. When it came to the Everglades, he did his homework, devised a plan and stuck to it."

Energy
Early in his term as governor of Florida, Bush was an outspoken opponent of drilling for oil and gas in the Gulf of Mexico, off Florida's shores. This stance was in opposition to the position of most Republicans, including Jeb's brother George W. Bush, who sought to expand drilling. However, later on in his term, Bush switched positions; "in 2005, he angered environmentalists by backing a bill in Congress to allow drilling in some of the same areas he had fought to keep off limits in 2001, in exchange for creating a 125-mile buffer zone around the state where drilling would be blocked," arguing that this was the most realistic plan to protect Florida waters. In July 2008, Bush stated "had I known that gas was going to be $4.30 per gallon, ... I would have supported a lifting of the [drilling] moratorium with proper safeguards."

Bush has consistently supported offshore drilling outside Florida, including in the Arctic National Wildlife Refuge.  In 2013, Bush "called for opening up 'federal lands and water for drilling in a thoughtful way.'"  Bush supports the TransCanada's Keystone XL oil pipeline, stating that it is a "no-brainer." The same month, Bush told the Manchester, New Hampshire Union Leader editorial board that he would "probably" close a U.S. embassy to Cuba if elected.

France
In a  Republican primary debate in October 2015, Bush criticized fellow Republican candidate Marco Rubio's poor Senate attendance record by comparing it to a "French workweek" in which "you get like three days where you have to show up." The remark sparked criticism in France, "for playing to a stereotype that, economists say and statistics show, is grossly exaggerated."   Following the remark, Gérard Araud, the French ambassador to the United States, noted that the French work an average of 39.6 hours a week, more than the Germans.

Bush subsequently apologized to the French government for the remark.

Guantanamo Bay
In August 2015, asked what he would do with prisoners who remain at the Guantanamo Bay detention camp in Cuba, Bush replied: "Keep 'em there."

Iran
Bush has called the April 2015 Iran nuclear deal framework a "horrific deal" and said he would likely terminate any final agreement should he become president.  He has argued that the deal would put Iran into a position where it could intimidate the Middle East. Bush condemned the July 2015 final nuclear agreement between Iran and the P5+1 world powers, calling it "appeasement." However, Bush stated that he would not seek to revoke the agreement on his first day in office.

Israel
Bush says that he is "an unwavering supporter" of Israel and Israeli Prime Minister Benjamin Netanyahu.  In a speech, Bush said his brother, former President George W. Bush, was his main adviser on policy with the Middle East. Bush later clarified that he was referring to policy on Israel, rather than on the Middle East as a whole.

Iraq, Syria, and ISIL
In August 2015, Bush said that additional U.S. ground troops may be needed in Iraq (beyond the estimated 3,500 U.S. military trainers and advisers there now) to fight the Islamic State of Iraq and the Levant (ISIS or ISIL), but did not call for a major deployment of forces. Bush said that he favored building a new U.S. base in Iraq's al-Anbar province,  and embedding some U.S. troops with Iraqi armed forces to help train them and identify targets as joint terminal attack controllers (JTACs). Daniel W. Drezner, a professor of international politics at the Fletcher School of Law and Diplomacy at Tufts University, wrote in the Washington Post in August 2015 that: "If you look at Bush's actual specifics on Iraq, most of the things he suggests — 'support the Iraqi forces,' 'more support to the Kurds,' 'restart the serious diplomatic efforts' — aren't all that different from the current administration's policies. Bush might propose more forward deployment of U.S. forces, but otherwise his Iraq policy boils down to 'I'll try harder.'" Tim Mak of the Daily Beast, writing in August 2015, similarly noted that Bush is not pressing for "an aggressive policy shift" and that "many of the things [that Bush] is advocating for are being pursued by Obama and his administration," including U.S. support for the Iraqi forces, provision of U.S. aid to Kurdish fighters, U.S. engagement with Sunni tribes, and U.S.-led airstrikes against ISIS. Mak noted that "on the issue of arming the Kurds directly instead of the current policy, sending aid through the central Iraqi government, an issue his fellow Republicans have raised, Bush is silent."

In November 2015, Bush called for "overwhelming force" to be used against ISIL, including the deployment of U.S. ground troops, saying: "While air power is essential, it alone cannot bring the results we seek. The United States – in conjunction with our NATO allies and more Arab partners – will need to increase our presence on the ground."

Bush has called for establishing "safe zones" along the Syria-Turkey border as "a safe harbor for refugees, and to allow us to rebuild the remnants of the Syria free army." Bush has also called for imposing and enforcing a no-fly zone across part of Syria. In October 2015, Bush criticized rival Marco Rubio and other congressional Republicans for failing to approve President Obama's request to authorize military intervention in Syria, made in 2013 after the Ghouta chemical attack. Bush said: "I think people were sticking their fingers in the breeze and that's wrong. We should support the President because that was better than inaction. No action at all, we see what happens."

Bush has said that the U.S. is "duty-bound to provide support ... to deal with taking Assad out and taking ISIS out." Bush has not explained how Assad should be removed.

In May 2015, Bush stated that he would have ordered the 2003 invasion of Iraq had he been president at the time: "I would have [authorized the invasion], and so would have Hillary Clinton, just to remind everybody. And so would almost everybody that was confronted with the intelligence they got." He also indicated that the lack of focus on post-invasion security was a mistake.  Several days later, Bush stated: "knowing what we know now, ... I would not have engaged. ... I would not have gone into Iraq." According to reporting by CNN, "Bush argued that the invasion—though perhaps inspired by faulty intelligence—had been beneficial, saying the world was 'significantly safer' without Saddam Hussein in power."

In an August 2015 speech, Bush defended his brother's handling of the Iraq War, stating: "I'll tell you, taking out Saddam Hussein turned out to be a pretty good deal." Bush stated that "the decision to dismantle the Iraqi army was a mistake, and I think my brother would admit that today." Bush blamed President Obama and former Secretary of State Hillary Clinton for the rise of ISIS and other post-Iraq War turmoil, saying that this was caused by a "premature" withdrawal of U.S. forces from Iraq in 2011. This statement attracted criticism (from Army Chief of Staff Raymond Odierno and others) because the U.S. withdrawal in 2011 was negotiated in 2008 by the George W. Bush administration.

Military spending
Bush has called for increased military spending, expressing the belief that 2.5% of GDP is an insufficient amount. In an August 2015 speech, Bush asserted that "we are in the seventh year of a significant dismantling of our own military," although in fact U.S. real spending on the military continued to increase until 2012.

Bush has called for reversing the sequestration cuts as applied to the military, which reduced the U.S. military budget by $1 trillion.

Bush has proposed a costly military buildup. Bush's plan calls for increasing the size of the Army by 40,000 soldiers and increasing the size of the Marine Corps by an additional 4,000 marines. He also favors increasing Navy submarine production, favoring plans to build two Virginia-class submarines a year (each such ship costs about $3 billion). Bush has also pledged to "'halt the mothballing of certain ships, such as cruisers, slated for premature retirement due to budget cuts,' a move that could cost hundreds of millions." For the Air Force, Bush proposed purchasing of a "minimum" of one hundred Long Range Strike Bombers, which would cost more than $100 billion. Bush also supports the F-35 Joint Strike Fighter program, the most expensive weapons program in U.S. history ($400 billion), but also "would explore other options for air supremacy," including a restoration of the F-22 or speeding up development of a new "air superiority combat system." Bush also supports renovation of the U.S. nuclear weapon arsenal.

Refugees
In September 2015, Bush stated that the United States should accept some refugees of the Syrian Civil War as long as there were adequate checks to "make sure that they're not part of ISIS or something like that," noting that the United States "has a noble tradition of accepting refugees."

In November 2015, speaking on CNN, Bush said: "I think we need to do thorough screening and take in a limited number  ... We should focus our efforts as it relates to the refugees for the Christians." When later asked how he would identify Christian Syrian families, Bush said the burden would be on the refugees to demonstrate their religion: "You're a Christian—I mean, you can prove you're a Christian. You can't prove it, then, you know, you err on the side of caution." The suggestion by Bush and other Republican primary candidates that Christian refugees should be given priority drew a sharp response from President Obama, who called such proposals "shameful" and said "We don't have religious tests to our compassion."

Russia
Bush has called Russian president Vladimir Putin a "bully" and called for a "more robust" approach. Bush told reporters during a European trip in June 2015 that the U.S. should "consider putting troops" in Poland, Lithuania, Latvia and Estonia. Bush also proposed expanding U.S. military exercises in the region.

Bush has not offered a "detailed plan for ending the presence of Russian-backed troops in Ukraine."

Use of torture
When asked in June 2015 on the use of torture by the United States, Bush stated "I don't think that's necessary. Because I don't think we need it, it's not the law." When pressed on whether that position applied after the September 11 attacks, Bush stated: "I think it was appropriate at the time, given what we—you know, the uncertainty. We were under attack. I think it was appropriate—it was also appropriate to change the policies once we had enough history."

In August 2015, however, when asked whether he would retain or repeal President Obama's executive order prohibited the use of "enhanced interrogation techniques," Bush refused to rule out the use of torture, saying that while he was opposed to torture in general, "I don't want to make a definitive, blanket kind of statement." Bush also "said there was a difference between enhanced interrogation and torture" but declined to be specific.

References

Political positions of state governors of the United States
Political positions of the 2016 United States presidential candidates
Jeb Bush